Kabelo Moshaoa is a Botswana footballer. He currently plays as a midfielder for the Boteti Young Fighters. He also won one cap for the Botswana national football team in 2001.

See also
Football in Botswana

References

External links

Living people
Association football midfielders
Botswana footballers
Botswana international footballers
Year of birth missing (living people)